Osterhofen is a town in the district of Deggendorf, in Bavaria, Germany. It is situated on the right bank of the Danube, 16 km south of Deggendorf.

The town surrounds Osterhofen Abbey, a former monastery, whose abbey church is now the Basilica of St. Margaretha.

References

Deggendorf (district)